Call Jane is a 2022 American drama film starring Elizabeth Banks as a suburban housewife in the 1960s who deals with a life-threatening pregnancy. The film also stars Sigourney Weaver, Chris Messina, Kate Mara, Wunmi Mosaku, Cory Michael Smith, Grace Edwards, and John Magaro. It is directed by Phyllis Nagy. The screenplay was written by Hayley Schore and Roshan Sethi.

It premiered at the 2022 Sundance Film Festival on January 21, 2022. It was released in the United States on October 28, 2022, by Roadside Attractions.

Synopsis

Joy, a traditional housewife in the United States in the 1960s, learns that she is pregnant with a second child but that the pregnancy threatens her life. She comes across the Janes, an underground network of women who take risks to provide abortions to pregnant women.

Cast

Production
The script originally appeared on the 2017 Black List, where it received seven votes. Coincidentally, another script based on the same story, titled This is Jane by Daniel Loflin, was also featured on the same Black List, with nine votes.

It was announced in October 2020 that Elizabeth Banks, Sigourney Weaver, Kate Mara and Rupert Friend had been cast to star in the film. Elisabeth Moss and Susan Sarandon had been initially cast as Joy and Virginia respectively, but both had to exit due to scheduling conflicts. Filming began in Hartford, Connecticut in May 2021, with Wunmi Mosaku joining the cast. In May 2021, Chris Messina, Cory Michael Smith, Aida Turturro, Grace Edwards and Bianca D'Ambrosio joined the cast of the film, with Friend no longer attached.

Release
It premiered at the 2022 Sundance Film Festival on January 21, 2022. On February 4, 2022, Roadside Attractions acquired the film's distribution rights, with plans to release it theatrically in the fall. It was released on October 28, 2022.

The film was released for VOD on December 6, 2022, followed by a Blu-ray and DVD release on December 13, 2022.

The film partnered with Planned Parenthood and the Abortion Care Network to screen at dozens of American clinics. In a statement by Nagy, the director hoped that screenings would serve as an opportunity to increase awareness around direct abortion care services in the months following the overturning of Roe v. Wade.

Reception 
 

On its opening weekend, Call Jane grossed $243,922.

References

External links
 

2022 films
2022 independent films
American drama films
Films about abortion
Films set in 1968
Films set in 1973
Films shot in Los Angeles
2022 drama films
Roadside Attractions films
2020s feminist films
2020s English-language films
2020s American films